Ibaraki Prefecture in Japan held a gubernatorial on September 11, 2005. Incumbent governor Masaru Hashimoto was re-elected. All candidates stood as independents but were backed by different parties.

Sources 
 

2005 elections in Japan
Gubernatorial elections in Japan
September 2005 events in Japan
Politics of Ibaraki Prefecture